Shi'a Islam is practiced by only a small percentage of the population of Tajikistan;  a 2009 U.S. State Department report puts the proportion at 3% of the country, compared to 95% for Sunni Islam.

The base of the Shi'a population in Tajikistan are the Pamiris, who practice Nizari Ismailism, a variant of Shi'a Islam which holds that there is an unbroken chain of living imams down to the present day, currently represented by the Aga Khan, the 49th imam. The Pamiri Ismaili homeland is in Gorno-Badakhshan in Tajikistan's mountainous east alongside the border with Xinjiang, with their spiritual and cultural capital in the city of Khorugh.

References

Further reading
Frank Bliss. Social and economic change in the Pamirs (Gorno-Badakhshan, Tajikistan).  Routledge, 2005.  , 

Tajikistan
Islam in Tajikistan